Stark is a 1993 British-Australian television serial, based on the bestselling 1989 novel Stark by comedian Ben Elton. The three-episode series, directed by Nadia Tass, was an international coproduction between the British Broadcasting Corporation and the Australian Broadcasting Corporation. It starred Ben Elton and Jacqueline McKenzie.

Production
The budget for the series was A$7 million, with most of the money coming from the BBC. Elton wrote the script adapted from his own novel, as well as taking the starring role as the "whinging Pom", CD.

Cast
 Ben Elton as CD (Colin Dobson)
 Jacqueline McKenzie as Rachel O'Donoghue
 Colin Friels as Sly Morgan
 Deborra-Lee Furness as Chrissie
 Derrick O'Connor as Zimmerman
 Bill Wallis as Walter
 Bill Hunter as Ocker Tyron
 John Neville as Lord De Quincey

Locations
Although Stark is primarily set in Western Australia, the series was filmed in two other Australian states: Victoria and South Australia. Desert scenes, which make up much of the later episodes, were filmed in and around Coober Pedy.

Broadcast
Stark was first aired by the ABC in Australia over two nights on 11 and 12 August (the first and second episodes were edited together into one movie-length episode; the third episode aired as the second and final episode in Australia). The series did not air in the United Kingdom until it appeared on BBC2 on Wednesday nights from 8–22 December.

Differences between the series and the novel

The main changes from the plot of the novel were the extent of the Stark Consipiracy's plan, and the ending. In the novel, Rachel escapes from Stark just prior to the launch, the Star Arks land at their moonbase and the conspirators are quickly consumed by their own greed, selfishness and hatred, with Sly eventually committing suicide. In the series, Lord de Quincy intends to scuttle a fleet of 'leper ships' carrying toxic waste, to actually hasten the extinction of the human species. Sly boards the rocket with Rachel, who has fallen in love with him, and the pair stage a mutiny, although they are killed when the Star Arks are shot down by the United States Air Force. In an interview included on the DVD edition, Elton states that this change was suggested by producer Michael Wearing, who was concerned that the novel lacked a "jeopardy point".

Several of the main characters' names are also changed in the series: Sly Moorcock was renamed Sly Morgan, and Lord Playing is renamed Lord De Quincey.

References

External links

Variety Review

1993 British television series debuts
1993 British television series endings
1990s British drama television series
1990s Australian television miniseries
1990s British television miniseries
BBC television dramas
Television shows based on British novels
1993 Australian television series debuts
1993 Australian television series endings
Australian Broadcasting Corporation original programming
Television shows written by Ben Elton